Erpingham Rural District was a rural district in Norfolk, England from 1894 to 1974.

It was formed under the Local Government Act 1894 based on the Erpingham rural sanitary district, taking its name from the ancient North and South Erpingham hundreds - but did not, initially, include some parishes from these hundreds including Erpingham parish itself. It lay on the north coast of Norfolk around the Urban Districts of Cromer and, later, Sheringham (created 1901, extended 1914).

In 1935 Erpingham RD took in several parishes from Aylsham Rural District, and ceded smaller areas to Walsingham and Smallburgh RDs.

In 1974, the district was abolished under the Local Government Act 1972, and became part of the North Norfolk district.

Statistics

Parishes

References

Districts of England created by the Local Government Act 1894
Districts of England abolished by the Local Government Act 1972
Historical districts of Norfolk
Rural districts of England